Annibale Albani (15 August 1682 – 21 September 1751) was an Italian Cardinal.

Biography
Annibale Albani was born in Urbino as a member of the Albani family, of Albanian-Italian origin. His parents were Orazio Albani, brother of Pope Clement XI, and Maria Bernardina Ondedei-Zonghi. A nephew of the Pope, he became Cardinal Bishop of Sabina (1711).  He was the elder brother of Cardinal Alessandro Albani, an even more famous collector.

In 1709 during the War of the Spanish Succession he was appointed papal nuncio in Vienna with the aim of defending the feudal rights of the Holy See and of reclaiming territories occupied by the Empire, an aim eventually foiled by the death of the Emperor Joseph I in 1711. In 1710 he went to Dresden where he was instrumental in securing the conversion of the future King Augustus III of Poland from Lutheranism to Roman Catholicism. He continued to be active in papal diplomacy until the 1740s.

As a patron of ecclesiastical literature, he left a valuable library, a gallery of paintings and sculpture, and a cabinet of coins that eventually was added to the Vatican collection. He edited, in two volumes, the letters, briefs, and bulls of Clement XI (1724), the Menologium Græcorum (1727), and historical memoirs of Urbino (1722–24).

References

Sources

1682 births
1751 deaths
People from Urbino
Annibale
18th-century Italian Roman Catholic bishops
Cardinal-bishops of Porto
Cardinal-bishops of Sabina
Cardinal-nephews
18th-century Italian cardinals
Camerlengos of the Holy Roman Church